The San Antonio Academy is a private school for boys located in San Antonio, Texas.  The school is accredited by the Independent Schools Association of the Southwest. The school was founded in 1886 and has since then moved locations several times. San Antonio Academy has about 30 students per grade, and 15 students per class. Academy boys also shine in athletics and in fine arts. Through the respected military program in grades 3‐8, boys acquire leadership skills and develop the "esprit de corps" that comes from working together to achieve common goals.

Notable alumni include Josef Centeno and David Scott.

References

External links
 

 
Independent Schools Association of the Southwest
Private elementary schools in Texas
Private middle schools in Texas
Schools in San Antonio
Educational institutions established in 1886
1886 establishments in Texas